Alex Bazzie (born August 5, 1990) is a Liberian professional Canadian football defensive lineman who is a free agent. He most recently played for the BC Lions of the Canadian Football League (CFL). He played college football at Marshall University. He enrolled at Fork Union Military Academy for a year after high school to improve his grades and meet eligibility requirements. He has also been a member of the Indianapolis Colts, Carolina Panthers and Arizona Cardinals of the National Football League.

Early years
Bazzie was born in Liberia and later moved to Maryland, where he attended Northwood High School in Silver Spring, Maryland.

Professional career
In late June 2014 Bazzie attended the Cleveland Browns rookie camp after going unselected in the 2014 NFL Draft.

BC Lions
Bazzie was signed by the BC Lions on May 19, 2014. He registered 43 tackles and ten sacks in 17 regular season games during the 2014 season. Bazzie continued to be a significant part of the Lions defense over the next two seasons, and through 3 seasons he had played in 50 games, recording 83 defensive tackles, 8 special teams tackles, 29 sacks, and 2 forced fumbles. He was set to become a free agent in February 2017, however the Lions released him in early January so he could pursue an NFL contract.

Indianapolis Colts
On January 9, 2017, Bazzie signed a reserve/future contract with the Indianapolis Colts. He was waived by the Colts on May 1, 2017.

Carolina Panthers
On May 6, 2017, Bazzie signed with the Carolina Panthers. He was waived on May 30, 2017.

Arizona Cardinals
On June 6, 2017, Bazzie signed with the Arizona Cardinals. He was waived on September 2, 2017.

BC Lions (II) 
On September 19, 2017, Alex Bazzie signed a one-year contract with the BC Lions.

Edmonton Eskimos 
Bazzie spent the 2018 and 2019 CFL seasons with the Edmonton Eskimos.

Toronto Argonauts 
As a free agent, Bazzie signed with the Toronto Argonauts on February 11, 2020. However, with the 2020 CFL season cancelled, he did not play in 2020 and he became a free agent upon the expiry of his contract on February 9, 2021.

BC Lions (III) 
On October 8, 2021, it was announced that Bazzie had signed with the BC Lions. He played in six games where he had six defensive tackles and one sack and became a free agent again on February 8, 2022.

References

External links
BC Lions profile 
Marshall Thundering Herd bio
College stats
NFL Draft Scout

1990 births
Living people
African-American players of American football
African-American players of Canadian football
American football defensive tackles
BC Lions players
Canadian football defensive linemen
Marshall Thundering Herd football players
People from Silver Spring, Maryland
Players of American football from Maryland
Indianapolis Colts players
Carolina Panthers players
Arizona Cardinals players
Liberian emigrants to the United States
Liberian players of American football
Edmonton Elks players
Toronto Argonauts players
21st-century African-American sportspeople